Podocarpus salomoniensis is a species of conifer in the family Podocarpaceae. It is found only in Solomon Islands.

References

salomoniensis
Data deficient plants
Taxonomy articles created by Polbot